

Awards 

This is a comprehensive list of awards won by Dottie Rambo, an American singer-songwriter

Awards by date 

Christian Music Hall of Fame Inductee:
2008
Nashville Songwriter's Association International Winner:
2007
Nashville Songwriter's Hall Of Fame --Barbara Mandrell presented the honor.

Atlanta Country Music Association
2007
Atlanta Country Music Hall Of Fame

T.D. Jakes and Potter's House Church
2007
Lady Of Excellence Award

State Of Kentucky
2006
Kentucky Music Hall Of Fame --Lily Tomlin presented the honor.

Diamond Awards
2005
Songwriter of the Year

North American Country Music Association International
2004
NACMAI Hall Of Fame

ASCAP Foundation
2001
Lifetime Achievement Award

Dove Award Winner:

1981
Songwriter of the Year
Song of the Year – "We Shall Behold Him"
1991
Gospel Music Hall of Fame
1997
Traditional Gospel Recorded Song Of The Year – "I Go To The Rock" Rambo accepted as composer and Whitney Houston accepted as performer. Houston also performed the song on the national telecast with the Georgia Mass Choir.
2001
Gospel Music Hall Of Fame – "The Rambos"

Grammy Winner:

1968
Best Soul Gospel Performance – "The Soul of Me"

Christian Country Music Association
1994 Songwriter Of The Century Award
2002 Living Legend Award
2004 Songwriter Of The Year
2004 Pioneer Of The Year

Rambo, Dottie